Lost Lake, also known as Knop/p/s Pond, is a reservoir in Groton, Massachusetts, United States. It was formed from three lakes by the headwaters of Salmon Brook.  The southern part of the lake is known as Knops Pond where it is near 30 feet deep.  It is stocked with rainbow, brown and brook trout every spring and fall and is home to several species of warm water fish. A boat launch is located on the northeastern side of the lake.

References

Lakes of Middlesex County, Massachusetts
Reservoirs in Massachusetts